The 2020–21 TCU Horned Frogs men's basketball team represented Texas Christian University during the 2020–21 NCAA Division I men's basketball season. The team is led by fifth-year head coach Jamie Dixon, and plays their home games at Schollmaier Arena in Fort Worth, Texas as a member of the Big 12 Conference. They finished the season 12-14, 5-11 in Big 12 Play to finish in 8th place. They lost in the first round of the Big 12 tournament to Kansas State.

Previous season
They finished the season 16–15, 7–11 in Big 12 play to finish in a tie for seventh place. They lost in the first round of the Big 12 tournament to Kansas State.

Roster

Schedule and results

|-
!colspan=12 style=|Regular season

|-
!colspan=12 style=| Big 12 tournament

References

TCU Horned Frogs men's basketball seasons
TCU Horned Frogs
TCU Horned Frogs men's basketball
TCU Horned Frogs men's basketball